The Lent Bumps (also Lent Races, Lents) are a set of rowing races held annually on the River Cam in Cambridge. They began in 1887, after separating from the May Bumps, which are bumping races held in mid-June. Prior to the separation there had been a single set of annual bumps dating from its inception in 1827. The races are open to all college boat clubs from the University of Cambridge, the University Medical and Veterinary Schools and Anglia Ruskin Boat Club. The Lent Bumps take place over five days (Tuesday to Saturday) at the end of February / start of March and are run as bumps races.

The most recent in the series was the Lent Bumps 2023, held from 7 to 11 March 2023.

Structure 

The races are run in divisions, each containing 17 crews. The number of crews in each bottom division varies yearly depending on new entrants. Each crew consists of eight rowers and one coxswain. Unlike the May Bumps, rowers trialling for places in university crews are not allowed to take part in the Lents. A total of 120 crews took part in 2020, totalling around 1080 participants. There are currently four divisions for men's crews (referred to as M1, M2 ... M4) and four divisions for women's crews (similarly W1 to W4). Both M4 and W4 are "short" divisions which marshall together; W4 goes off 5 minutes separated from M4 whereas other divisions are separated by 40 minutes. The divisions represent an overall race order, with Division 1 at the top. The ultimate aim is to try to finish Head of the River (also said as gaining the 'Headship'), i.e. first position in Division 1.

At the start, signalled by a cannon, each crew is separated by a distance of about 1½ boat lengths (approximately 30 m or 90 ft). Once the race has begun, a crew must attempt to catch up with the crew ahead of it and bump (physically touch or overtake it) before the crew behind does the same to them. A crew which bumps or is bumped must pull to the side of the river to allow other crews to continue racing. A crew which neither bumps the crew ahead nor is bumped by the crew behind before crossing the finishing post is said to have rowed over. Any crew which bumps then swaps places with the crew that it bumped in the following day's racing. A crew which rows over stays in the same position. Crews finishing at the top of a division, the sandwich boat, row at the bottom of the next division to try to move up a division. The process is repeated over four effective days, allowing crews to move up or down in the overall order of boats. The finish order of one year's Lent Bumps is then used as the starting order of the following year's races. Due to the shortness of reliable daylight, the races are actually currently run over five days, with one division level dropped out each day except Saturday: on Tuesday M/W 1, on Wednesday 2, Thursday 3 and Friday 4.

Between 2010 and 2019, the leading men's and women's crews of the Lent Bumps went on to race the leading Oxford Torpids men's and women's crews at the Henley Boat Races around Easter. However, following the move of The Lightweight Boat Races to the Championship Course, this competition ceased to be held.

Crews finishing Head of the River

Men's Lent Bumps (1887–2023) 

Lent Bumps were cancelled from 1915 to 1918 due to war, and in 1895 and 1963 due to ice; in 2018 two days were lost to the towpath being too icy for bank parties and umpires; in 2023, the Friday day was lost due to high rainfall and resulting high stream. The Lents in 1888 were not completed due to the death of an oarsman. When the races ceased,  were in 1st position. The Lent Bumps 2001 were not completed due to an outbreak of Foot and Mouth disease in the UK. The outbreak closed the towpath along the river, where all of the umpiring for the bumps takes place. When the races were abandoned on Friday 2 March 2001,  were in 1st position. The Lents were also cancelled in 2021 due to the COVID-19 pandemic.

In 1919, college 1st VIIIs did not race as it was the first race after World War I. The start order for the 1920 races was the finish order for the 1914 races. Prior to 1946  were two separate rowing clubs: 1st Trinity and 3rd Trinity, hence both separate and combined titles.

Women's Lent Bumps (1976–2023) 

NB. The Lent Bumps were not completed in 2001 due to an outbreak of Foot and Mouth disease in the UK. When the races were abandoned on Friday 2 March 2001,  were in 1st position. The Lents were also cancelled in 2021 due to the COVID-19 pandemic.

Table of Winning Boats (1887–2023)

Nineteen boats have been head of the river. 

* The head of the river in 1919 was, unusually, 1st Trinity’s second boat. It was the first race after World War I and 1st eights did not race. The start order for the 1920 races was the finish order for the 1914 races.

Prior to 1946  were two separate rowing clubs: 1st Trinity and 3rd Trinity, hence both separate and combined titles.

Anglia Ruskin, Clare Hall, Darwin, Homerton, Hughes Hall, King's, Lucy Cavendish, Magdalene, Robinson, St. Catharine's, Selwyn, Sidney Sussex, St Edmund's, Wolfson, Addenbrooke's and the Veterinary School are the regular entrants never to have finished Head of the River in either the men's or women's events.

See also
 Links to individual Lent Bumps results
 May Bumps, the equivalent event in the summer
 Torpids, a similar event in Oxford

References

External links

CUCBC — the organisation that runs the bumps
Cambridge bumps charts — archive of results 1992-2015

Recurring sporting events established in 1887
1887 establishments in England
Rowing at the University of Cambridge
Rowing competitions in the United Kingdom
Bumps races
February events
March events
Annual sporting events in the United Kingdom
River Cam